Kurt vid Stein (born 17 November 1935) is a Danish former cyclist. He competed at the 1960 Summer Olympics and the 1964 Summer Olympics.

References

External links
 

1935 births
Living people
Danish male cyclists
Olympic cyclists of Denmark
Cyclists at the 1960 Summer Olympics
Cyclists at the 1964 Summer Olympics
Cyclists from Copenhagen